Lignyodes pallidus is a species of leguminous seed weevil in the beetle family Curculionidae.

References

Further reading

External links

 

Curculioninae
Articles created by Qbugbot
Beetles described in 1876